Brian Mayanja (born January 25, 1983) is a boxer from Uganda, who participated in the 2004 Summer Olympics for his native African country. There he was outscored in the first round of the Featherweight (57 kg) division by Kazakhstan's Galib Jafarov. He qualified for the Athens Games by winning the silver medal at the 1st AIBA African 2004 Olympic Qualifying Tournament in Casablanca, Morocco. In the final of the event he lost to Tunisian fighter Saifeddine Nejmaoui.

References
sports-reference

1983 births
Featherweight boxers
Olympic boxers of Uganda
Living people
Boxers at the 2004 Summer Olympics
Ugandan male boxers